Fishing & Adventure is a New Zealand television show hosted by cousins Scott Parry and Michael (Mig) Rumney. The show made its debut in 2013 and is now in its 9th season. Currently the show is aired on TVNZ 1 with the past seasons available online through YouTube and TVNZ OnDemand. Fishing & Adventure follows the cousins while the fish, dive and hunt their way around New Zealand destinations. Each episode is based on completing a challenge set by crew which is then either celebrated if achieved or punished by a consequence if failed. Their style is down to earth and resonates with a wide audience. The show is also known for its educational aspect as Scott and Mig often share their trade tips and secrets.

History 
The  idea for Fishing & Adventure was developed by cousins Scott and Mig in 2011. While working together in a different industry they noticed a gap in the market for a new approach to fishing. After being turned down by a few big networks, Fishing & Adventure made its debut 10 episode season in February 2013.

Locations 
All seasons are filmed off the coast of the North & South Island of New Zealand. Fishing & Adventure focuses solely on New Zealand fishing destinations such as Coromandel, Raglan, Fiordland, and the East Cape.

References

External links 
 
 

2013 New Zealand television series debuts
2010s New Zealand television series
2020s New Zealand television series
English-language television shows
Fishing television series
New Zealand sports television series
Prime (New Zealand TV channel) original programming
TVNZ 1 original programming